Šilo  is a village in the north-east of the island of Krk, Croatia, population 384 (census 2011). It is one of the tourist centers of the Dobrinj municipality.

Geography
It is located in a well-sheltered lagoon called Stipanja, which is naturally enclosed by a cape called Punta Šilo.

Šilo is connected to the rest of the island of Krk by a regional road. It is 5 kilometers away from the center of its
municipality, Dobrinj. It is also 20 kilometers far from Krk Bridge; 19.1 km from the main city of the island, Krk; 13.6 km from Vrbnik, another settlement on Krk; and 47.7 km from Rijeka, which is the most important Croatian harbor and the third largest city in the country.

Stipanja bay is well protected from eastern and southern winds by a narrow and low peninsula at the end of which cape
Punta Šilo is located.

Šilo is the largest village in the municipality of Dobrinj, and it has the longest tourist tradition. It has numerous
beautiful, sunny, and preserved pebble beaches and coves. Above Šilo there is a lovely old settlement called Polje,
which, alongside of modern houses, has also preserved the traditional rural way of building as well as a traditional way of life.

History
Šilo was established by people from Crikvenica and Selce. The town has gained importance by development of tourism and the wish of people to travel to the islands. For a long time it was a link between the island of Krk and the continent. For these reasons on 19 February 1905 in Šilo the Krk Skydiving Society was established. After its foundation it bought a steamboat called Dinko Vitezić, and on 1 June 1905 it opened the regular Šilo – Vrbnik – Crikvenica boat line.

Tourism began to grow after the 1959, when the ferry between Crikvenica and Krk began regular service.

The basis of Šilo's economy is agriculture, fishing, tourism and ship building. Šilo also has an auto camp, tennis
courts, cafes and pizza places, a post office, a pastry shop, tourist agencies, a clinic, and the Municipality of Dobrinj
Tourist Board, as well as the biggest economic entity of Dobrinj municipality – a construction company.

References

External links
 http://www.tzo-dobrinj.hr/silo.asp
 http://www.klimno.net/silo_hr.htm

Populated places in Primorje-Gorski Kotar County
Krk